The 1968–69 Dallas Chaparrals season was the second season of the Chaparrals in the American Basketball Association. Once again, the Chaps lost to the New Orleans Buccaneers in the playoffs, this time in the Semifinals.

Roster

<noinclude>

Final standings

Western Division

Playoffs 
Western Division Semifinals

Awards and honors
1969 ABA All-Star Game selections (game played on January 28, 1969)
 John Beasley (named MVP)

References

 Chaparrals on Basketball Reference

External links
 RememberTheABA.com 1968-69 regular season and playoff results
 RememberTheABA.com Dallas Chaparrals page

Dallas Chaparrals
Dallas
Texas Chaparrals, 1968-69
Texas Chaparrals, 1968-69